Brian Baker and Sam Groth were the defending champions but chose not to defend their title.

Brydan Klein and Joe Salisbury won the title after defeating Denis Kudla and Miķelis Lībietis 6–2, 6–4 in the final.

Seeds

Draw

References
 Main Draw
 Qualifying Draw

Stockton ATP Challenger - Doubles